Cedric Lewis Jones (born April 30, 1974) is a former American football defensive end in the National Football League for the New York Giants, who played in Super Bowl XXXV. He played college football at the University of Oklahoma and was drafted in the first round (fifth overall) of the 1996 NFL Draft.

He signed with the St. Louis Rams in 2001, but he was injured in August and did not play.

References

1974 births
Living people
Players of American football from Houston
American football defensive ends
New York Giants players